Manzon is a surname. Notable people with the surname include:

Robert Manzon (1917–2015), French racing driver
Vadim Manzon (born 1995), Russian football forward

See also
Danzon (surname)
Manson
Manzin